The Ulysses Quartet (est. in 2015) is a professional string quartet based in New York City. The group's name pays homage to Homer's hero Odysseus and his 10-year voyage home, as well as to former U.S. President Ulysses S. Grant, near whose resting place in Upper Manhattan several of the group's members reside.

Concerts
The quartet has performed in such venues as Alice Tully Hall, Jordan Hall, and the Taiwan National Recital Hall. Performance highlights have included appearances at the Chamber Music Society of Lincoln Center, the Harbin Grand Theatre, Premiere Performances of Hong Kong, and Naumburg Orchestral Concerts. Other engagements have included the Buffalo Chamber Music Society; Cecilia Concerts (Halifax); South Orange Performing Arts Center (New Jersey); Sprague Hall at Yale University; Mostly Music (New Jersey); Rhode Island Chamber Music Concerts; Chamber Music Society of Bethlehem (Pennsylvania); National Arts Centre (Ottawa); Bargemusic; Eastman School of Music; and Vietnam Connection Music Festival.

The quartet also works to bring music to where people are, performing at such venues as local farmers markets, living rooms and other community gathering places. Their aim is to bring music particularly to young people who may not have had exposure to formal concert settings.

Awards and recognition 
The Ulysses Quartet won the grand prize and gold medal in the senior string division of the 2016 Fischoff National Chamber Music Competition and first prize in the 2018 Schoenfeld International String Competition. In 2017, the quartet finished first in the American Prize and won second prize at the Osaka International Chamber Music Competition. They were winners of the Vietnam International Music Competition in 2019. From 2017 to 2019, Ulysses was in residence at the Louis Moreau Institute in New Orleans, working with composer Morris Rosenzweig. In fall 2019, the Ulysses Quartet were named as Lisa Arnhold Fellows of the Juilliard School, an appointment that has been extended through May 2022.

Recordings 
The Ulysses Quartet has completed work on a debut album, to be released in 2021. Four more albums are in the planning stages, including collaborations with flutist Ransom Wilson and guitarist Ben Verdery, as well as albums of quartet works. As a special project, the group will record the quartets of composer Joseph Summer at Mechanics Hall in Worcester, Massachusetts, over the course of several years.

References

External links 
 

2015 establishments in New York City
American string quartets